The 1964–65 Southern Football League season was the 62nd in the history of the league, an English football competition.

Weymouth won the championship, whilst Corby Town, Hereford United, Poole Town and Wimbledon were all promoted to the Premier Division. Nine Southern League clubs applied to join the Football League at the end of the season, but none were successful.

Premier Division
The Premier Division consisted of 22 clubs, including 18 clubs from the previous season and four new clubs, promoted from Division One:
Cheltenham Town
Folkestone Town
King's Lynn
Tonbridge

League table

Division One
Division One consisted of 22 clubs, including 17 clubs from the previous season and five new clubs:
Four clubs relegated from the Premier Division:
Hereford United
Hinckley Athletic
Kettering Town
Merthyr Tydfil

Plus:
Wimbledon, transferred from the Isthmian League

Also, Yiewsley changed name to Hillingdon Borough.

League table

Football League elections
Alongside the four League clubs facing re-election, a total of 14 non-League clubs applied for election, including nine Southern League clubs. All four League clubs were re-elected.

References
RSSF – Southern Football League archive

Southern Football League seasons
S